was the 49th emperor of Japan, according to the traditional order of succession.  Kōnin's reign lasted from 770 to 781.

Traditional narrative
As a son of Imperial Prince Shiki and a grandson of Emperor Tenji, his formal style was Prince Shirakabe. Initially, he was not in line for succession, as Emperor Tenmu and his branch held the throne.

He married Imperial Princess Ikami, a daughter of Emperor Shōmu, producing a daughter and a son. After his sister-in-law Empress Shōtoku died, he was named her heir. The high courtiers claimed the empress had left her will in a letter in which she had appointed him as her successor. Prior to this, he had been considered a gentle man without political ambition.

Kōnin had five wives and seven Imperial sons and daughters.

Emperor Kōnin is traditionally venerated at his tomb; the Imperial Household Agency designates , in Nara, Nara, as the location of Kōnin's mausoleum.

Events of Kōnin's life

 September 8, 769: In the 5th year of Empress Shōtoku's reign, she died; she is said to have written a letter designating Senior Counselor Prince Shirakabe as her heir and crown prince.
 August 28, 770:   Exactly one (Japanese era-based) year later, the succession (senso) was received by Kōnin, who was the 62-year-old grandson of Emperor Tenji.
 October 23, 770: Emperor Kōnin was said to have acceded to the throne (sokui) in a formal ceremony, following the plans of the nobles and ministers to have him placed on the throne.  The era name was also changed on this date, to Hōki.
 781: The emperor abdicated in favor of his son Yamabe, who became Emperor Kanmu. Emperor Kōnin's reign had lasted for 11 years.
 781: Kōnin died at the age of 73.

Eras of Kōnin's reign
The years of Kammu's reign are more specifically identified by more than one era name (nengō).
 Hōki (770–781)
 Ten'ō (781–782)

Legacy
Kōnin attempted to reconstruct the state finance and administrative organizations, which had been corrupted under the reign of Empress Kōken.

Political conflict around his successors 
Soon after his enthronement in 770 (Hōki 1), he promoted his wife Imperial Princess Inoe or Ikami (the exact pronunciation of her name is unknown) to the empress and appointed her son Imperial Prince Osabe to the crown prince in the next year. As a grandson of Emperor Shōmu by his mother, Osabe was one of few descendants of Emperor Tenmu, the line of Tenmu however didn't succeed to the throne finally. In 772 Osabe was deprived of his crown prince rank and Imperial Prince Yamabe, an issue by another woman, later Emperor Kanmu was named heir.
 
In the fifth month of this year his son Osabe was deprived his crown prince status. In Hōki 4 (773), both were alleged to have murdered Imperial Princess Naniwa, a sister of Kōnin by cursing. This allegation made those two stripped of the rank of royals. Those two were together enclosed in a house in Yamato Province and died two years later in the same day, on the 27th day of the fourth month of Hōki 6 (on the Julian Calendar, on May 29, 775).

In 772, soon after Osabe's deprivation of heir right, Prince Yamabe was named heir. His mother Takano no Niigasa, née Yamato no Niigasa, was a descendant of King Muryeong of Baekje. Since her clan had then no political power, his appointment had not been likely to happen without the deprivation of Osabe, the noblest male issue of Konin as the son of an Imperial Princess and Empress.

Today it is pointed out the accusations to Ikami and Osabe were likely to be plotted for depriving her son of the throne, and they were likely to be assassinated, by Fujiwara no Momokawa.

The late years of Kōnin's reign and the early years of Kanmu's reign suffered disasters. The people took those disasters as vengeance of noble victims of political conflicts, including late Ikami and Osabe. In 800 during the reign of Kanmu,  Princess Ikami who had deceased in 775 was restored to the rank of Empress of Kōnin. Several shrines and temples were also founded for redemption, including Kamigoryō Shrine (:ja:上御霊神社).

Kugyō
 is a collective term for the very few most powerful men attached to the court of the Emperor of Japan in pre-Meiji eras.

In general, this elite group included only three to four men at a time.  These were hereditary courtiers whose experience and background would have brought them to the pinnacle of a life's career.  During Kōnin's reign, this apex of the Daijō-kan included:
 Sadaijin, Fujiwara no Nagate (藤原永手) (714–771),　766–771.
 Sadaijin, Fujiwara no Uona (藤原魚名) (721–783),　781–782.
 Udaijin, Ōnakatomi Kiyomaro (大中臣清麿) (702–788), 771–781.
 Naidaijin, Fujiwara no Yoshitsugu (藤原良継) (716–777), 771–777.
 Naidaijin, Fujiwara no Uona (藤原魚名) (721–783), 778–781
 Dainagon, Fun'ya no Ōchi (文室大市) (704–780), 771–777
 Dainagon, Fujiwara no Uona (藤原魚名) (721–783), 771–778
 Sangi, Fujiwara no Momokawa (藤原百川), 732–779.

Consorts and children

Empress (deposed in 772): Imperial Princess Inoe/Ikami (井上内親王), Emperor Shōmu’s daughter
Imperial Prince Osabe (他戸親王, 761–775), the Crown Prince (deposed in 772)
Imperial Princess Sakahito (酒人内親王), Saiō in Ise Shrine 772–775, and married to Emperor Kanmu

Hi: Princess Owari (尾張女王, d. 804), Prince Yuhara’s daughter (son of Prince Shiki)
Third Son: Imperial Prince Hieda (稗田親王, 751–781)

Bunin: Takano no Niigasa (高野新笠), Yamato no Ototsugu’s daughter
First Daughter: Imperial Princess Noto (能登内親王, 733–781), married to Prince Ichihara
First Son: Imperial Prince Yamabe (山部親王) later Emperor Kanmu
Second Son: Imperial Prince Sawara (早良親王), the Crown Prince (deposed in 785)

Bunin: Fujiwara no Sōshi (藤原曹子), Fujiwara no Nagate’s daughter

Bunin: Ki no Miyako (紀宮子), Ki no Ineko’s daughter

Bunin: Fujiwara no Nariko (藤原産子), Fujiwara no Momokawa’s daughter

Court lady: Agatanushi no Shimahime (県主嶋姫), Agatanushi no Emishi’s daughter
Imperial Princess Minuma (弥努摩内親王, d. 810), married to Prince Miwa (神王)

Court lady (Nyoju): Agatainukai no Isamimi (Omimi) (県犬養勇耳/男耳)
Hirone no Morokatsu (広根諸勝), removed from the Imperial Family by receiving the family name from Emperor (Shisei Kōka賜姓降下) in 787

Unknown Woman:
 Prince Kaisei (開成皇子, 724–781)

Ancestry

Notes

References
 
 
 Ponsonby-Fane, Richard Arthur Brabazon. (1959).  The Imperial House of Japan. Kyoto: Ponsonby Memorial Society. OCLC 194887
 Titsingh, Isaac. (1834). Nihon Ōdai Ichiran; ou,  Annales des empereurs du Japon.  Paris: Royal Asiatic Society, Oriental Translation Fund of Great Britain and Ireland.  OCLC 5850691
 Varley, H. Paul. (1980). Jinnō Shōtōki: A Chronicle of Gods and Sovereigns. New York: Columbia University Press. ;  OCLC 59145842

See also
 Emperor of Japan
 List of Emperors of Japan
 Imperial cult
 The Emperor's Birthday

Japanese emperors
709 births
782 deaths
8th-century Japanese monarchs
Japanese retired emperors